The Roman Catholic Diocese of Kimberley is a diocese of the Catholic Church based in the city of Kimberley in the Ecclesiastical province of Bloemfontein in South Africa. The seat of the bishop is the Cathedral of St. Mary in Kimberley.

History
 4 June 1886: Established as Vicariate Apostolic of Kimberley in Orange from Apostolic Vicariate of Cape of Good Hope, Eastern District and Apostolic Vicariate of Natal
 1918: Renamed as Apostolic Vicariate of Kimberley in South Africa
 11 January 1951: Promoted as Diocese of Kimberley

Bishops
Vicar Apostolic of Kimberley in Orange (Roman rite)
 Bishop Matteo Gaughren, O.M.I. (1902.01.13 – 1914.05.30)
 Vicar Apostolic of Kimberley in South Africa (Roman rite) 
 Bishop Herman Joseph Meysing, O.M.I. (1929.12.19 – 1951.01.11), appointed Archbishop of Bloemfontein
 Bishops of Kimberley (Roman rite)
 Bishop John Boekenfoehr, O.M.I. (1953.03.24 – 1974.07.01)
 Bishop Erwin Hecht, O.M.I. (1974.07.01 - 2009)
 Bishop Abel Gabuza (23 December 2010 – 9 December 2018)
 Bishop Duncan Theodore Tsoke (3 March 2021 – present)

Auxiliary Bishop
Erwin Hecht, O.M.I. (1972–1974), appointed Bishop here

See also
Roman Catholicism in South Africa

References

Sources

 GCatholic.org
 Catholic Hierarchy

Kimberley
Religious organizations established in 1886
Kimberley
Kimberley, Northern Cape
Roman Catholic Ecclesiastical Province of Bloemfontein